Adriana Birolli Ferreira (born 25 November 1986), known professionally as Adriana Birolli, is a Brazilian actress.  She was born in Curitiba, Paraná.

Selected filmography
 Faça Sua História (2008)
 Beleza Pura (2008)
 Viver a Vida (2009)
 Fina Estampa (2011)
 Império (2014)
 Belaventura (2017)

References

External links

1986 births
Living people
Actresses from Curitiba
Brazilian television actresses
Brazilian telenovela actresses